Live at Jazz Standard is an album by the Mingus Big Band that won the Grammy Award for Best Large Jazz Ensemble Album in 2011. The album documents a concert at the Jazz Standard club in New York City on New Year's Eve, 2009. The concert and the album commemorate the fiftieth anniversary of songs recorded by Charles Mingus. The band was conducted by Gunther Schuller and included trumpeter Randy Brecker, who played with Mingus during the 1970s.

Track listing

Personnel

 Gunther Schuller – conductor
 Douglas Yates – soprano saxophone, alto saxophone
 Vincent Herring – alto saxophone
 Abraham Burton – tenor saxophone
 Wayne Escoffery – tenor saxophone
 Lauren Sevian – baritone saxophone
 Conrad Herwig – trombone
 Frank Lacy – trombone
 Earl McIntyre – bass trombone
 Earl Gardner – trumpet
 Kenny Rampton – trumpet
 Randy Brecker – trumpet
 Earl McIntyre – tuba
 Boris Kozlov – bass
 Jeff "Tain" Watts – drums
 David Kikoski – piano
 Seth Abramson – producer
 Sue Mingus – producer

References

2010 live albums
Grammy Award for Best Large Jazz Ensemble Album
Big band albums
Live jazz albums
Albums recorded at Jazz Standard
Charles Mingus tribute albums